Nitrogen difluoride, also known as difluoroamino, is a reactive radical molecule with formula . This small molecule is in equilibrium with its dimer dinitrogen tetrafluoride.

As the temperature increases the proportion of  increases.

The molecule is unusual in that it has an odd number of electrons, yet is stable enough to study experimentally.

Properties

In , the N–F bond length is 1.3494 Å and the angle subtended at F–N–F is 103.33°.

In the infrared spectrum the N–F bond in  has a symmetrical stretching frequency of 1075 cm−1.

The microwave spectrum shows numerous lines due to spin transitions, with or without nuclear spin transitions. The lines form set of two triplets for antisymmetric singlet, or two triplets of triplets for symmetric triplet. Lines appear around 14–15, 24, 25, 26, 27, 28–29, 33, 60, 61, 62, and 65 GHz. The rotational constants for the  molecule are A = , B = , and C = . The inertial defect Δ = 0.1204 mu·Å2. The centrifugal distortion constants are τaaaa = −7.75, τbbbb = −0.081, τaabb = 0.30, and τabab = −0.13.

The dipole moment is 0.13 D.

The ground electronic state of the molecule is 2B1.

Use
Nitrogen difluoride is formed during the function of a xenon monofluoride excimer laser. Nitrogen trifluoride is the halide carrier gas, which releases fluoride ions when impacted by electrons:

The free fluoride ion goes on to react with xenon cations.

Nitrogen difluoride can be consumed further to yield nitrogen monofluoride.

References

Extra reading

Nitrogen fluorides
Free radicals